Sivadevuni Chikkala is situated in Andhra Pradesh near Palakol. It is located at a distance of 8 km from Palakol, en route to Bhimavaram. This place has Siva Temple, which has a 4 feet white sivalingam installed by lord Hanuman.

Sthala Puranam
Lord Sri Rama on his return from Sri Lanka after killing Ravana wants to perform pooja to Lord Siva at Rameswaram to wash off his sin of killing Ravana. Kula guru of Rama, Maharshi Vasishta fixes a muhurtham for installing the sivalingam. Rama instructs Hanuman to bring a sivalingam from Kasi for this purpose.

Obeying Rama's order, Hanuma reaches Kasi and selects a big beautiful white sivalingam. He keeps the lingam in a chikkam (nest of threads) and starts traveling back to Rameswaram. In his return journey, he stops by at this village to perform his early morning worship to Sun (the so-called sandhyavandanam or suryopasana). He keeps the chikkam in this place and finishes his worship, meditation and arghya tarpana to Sun. When he comes back from pooja and tries to lift the lingam, he realizes that the lingam has been installed in that place, that too at the same muhurtham where Vasishta wanted Rama to install the lingam at Rameswaram. After trying hard to lift the lingam, Hanuman realizes that it is impossible for him to separate it out from earth, so he gets a different lingam from Kasi. Meanwhile, since the muhurtham to install the lingam is approaching, Rama asks Sita to carve out a saikata lingam (lingam made up of sand), installs the same and finishes his worship. As the worship is done by the time Hanuman reaches with a new sivalingam, he himself installs it in Rameswaram.

As the Lord Siva has been installed here along with the chikkam, this village is called Sivadevuni chikkala.

History
A few hundred years back, this whole area was a forest. A few farmers while digging this area with an iron bar, found blood coming out from earth. Digging little further carefully, they figured out this white sivalingam in ground. The terrified farmers immediately reported this to the then king of Mogalturu. The king ordered his servants to dig down till the root of the lingam is found so that it an be taken out and installed. As they failed in that effort, king realised the mahatyam of the lord, constructed a temple and made arrangements for regular pooja.

Miracles and significance
Many devotees desirous of getting a child, plant a coconut tree in this temple garden. Belief is that their wish gets fulfilled in a year from planting the tree.

Details of the temple
Next to Lord Siva is Parvati's temple facing south. There is also a Lakshmi narayana temple in the same compound. There is a huge beautiful lake behind this temple.

Nearby places
Ksheera ramalingeswara kshetram, one of the pancharamas is 8 kilometers from this place. Another pancharama kshetram, the Sri Someshwara Janardhana Swamy temple which is in Gunupudi, Bhimavaram, is around 15 kilometers from this place.

Festivals
Lakhs of devotees visit this place during sivaratri time. Temple organizes laksha bilvarchana (worshipping with one Lakh Bilva leaves) during karthika masam. Sivaratri radhotsavam, laksha kunkumarchana, chandi yagam etc... are celebrated here every year.

References 

Hindu temples in West Godavari district